Axoclinus lucillae, known commonly as the Panama triplefin, is a species of triplefin blenny. The specific name honours Louise “Lulu” Miriam Parsons (1912–2013), the first wife of George Washington Vanderbilt III, although the eponym is more suggestive that the species is named after their daughter, Lucille Margaret Vanderbilt (1938 - 2018).

References

lucillae
Fish described in 1944